Thomas Henderson (born March 1, 1953), nicknamed "Hollywood",  is a former American football linebacker in the National Football League (NFL) for the Dallas Cowboys, San Francisco 49ers, Houston Oilers, and Miami Dolphins. He played college football at Langston University.

Early years
Henderson was raised by his teenage mother on the east side of Austin, Texas and played football for the L. C. Anderson High School "B" team until his sophomore year (1969), when he moved to Oklahoma City to live with his grandmother and find a more stable environment.

Although as a senior he earned All-City honors playing defensive end at Douglass High School, he was not recruited by colleges because his career had been shortened, after having to sit out his junior year after transferring. After graduation Henderson joined the Air Force, but quit before being sworn in.

College career
Henderson was a walk-on for the football team at the NAIA Langston University. His personality earned him the nickname "Wild Man" and helped him become a two-time small-college All-America defensive end.

As a senior, he contributed to the team's 11–1 record and a playoff appearance. He was named Southwest district Defensive Player of the Year. He started 45 straight games in his college career. He also practiced track and field, competing in the 100-yard dash (9.5 seconds) and the triple jump (49 feet).

In 2002, he was inducted into the Langston University Athletic Hall of Fame. In 2018, he was inducted into the Black College Football Hall of Fame.

Professional career

Dallas Cowboys
Henderson was selected in the first round (18th overall) of the 1975 NFL Draft, as part of the Dallas Cowboys Dirty Dozen draft. As a rookie, he focused on special teams. He returned a reverse handoff for a 97-yard kickoff return for a touchdown (fourth in franchise history) during the second game against the St. Louis Cardinals. He blocked a punt in the fourteenth game against the New York Jets.

In 1976, he competed with D.D. Lewis for the starting strongside linebacker position. He remained as a backup and core special teams player. He blocked a punt out of the end zone for a safety in the twelfth game against the St. Louis Cardinals.

In 1977, he was named the starting strongside linebacker over Randy White, who was moved to defensive tackle. He posted 53 tackles, 3 interceptions, one sack (unofficial) and 2 fumble recoveries. He returned an interception for a 79-yard touchdown against the Tampa Bay Buccaneers. He also claimed that he introduced the crossbar slam dunk celebration into the NFL at the end of the play. He led the team with 7 tackles in Super Bowl XII. Henderson gave himself the nickname "Hollywood" for his flamboyant play and high-visibility lifestyle.

In 1978, he couldn't start in 3 games because of an ankle injury. He returned an interception for a 68-yard touchdown (including a crossbar slam dunk) in the 28–0 NFC championship win against the Los Angeles Rams. Before Super Bowl XIII he started a war of words against the Pittsburgh Steelers, that ended up with him sharing a Newsweek magazine cover with quarterback Terry Bradshaw. He also pinned Bradshaw's arms, allowing linebacker Mike Hegman to steal the ball and run 37 yards for a touchdown in Super Bowl XIII. He was selected to the Pro Bowl at the end of the season.

Even though he had great potential as a player, Henderson's destructive lifestyle of drugs and alcohol began to catch up with him. During many games, he snorted liquid cocaine from an inhaler he hid in his pants. The final straw came in 1979, during the twelfth game against the Washington Redskins at RFK Stadium. While his team was being soundly beaten 34–20 on national television, Henderson mugged for the camera and displayed handkerchiefs with the Cowboys team logo. When interviewed about it, he blamed teammate Preston Pearson, saying that Pearson had asked him to show off the handkerchiefs, which Pearson was marketing, as a favor. Coach Tom Landry was so angered by the episode that after threatening to waive him, he instead deactivated Henderson for the remainder of the season by placing him on the reserve-retired list. According to sources close to the team, Landry did not intend for Henderson to ever play for the Cowboys again, even though the coach was still personally fond of Henderson.

San Francisco 49ers
On May 15, 1980, he was traded to the San Francisco 49ers in exchange for a fourth round draft choice (#91, Scott Pelluer). On September 19, he was waived after only playing one game. Henderson believed that 49ers coach Bill Walsh unloaded him because he suspected he was addicted to cocaine.

Houston Oilers
On September 24, 1980, he signed as a free agent with the Houston Oilers. He appeared in only six games because of a hamstring injury and played in the Oilers' playoff loss to the Oakland Raiders. He was not re-signed after the season.

Miami Dolphins
In February 1981, he became one of the first football players to publicly admit to a drug problem, and with the help of the NFL, he signed himself into a drug rehabilitation program. On June 10, Henderson signed with the Miami Dolphins, but suffered what proved to be a career-ending neck injury in the final preseason game against the Kansas City Chiefs. On August 31, he was placed on the injured reserve list. He was not re-signed after the season.

Personal life
Lawrence Taylor, perhaps the greatest player ever at the linebacker position, said that he was inspired to wear 56 because it was Henderson's number.

In November 1983, Henderson was arrested and charged with two counts of false imprisonment and one count each of forced oral copulation, sexual battery and furnishing cocaine to a minor.

The felony counts include an allegation that Henderson used a gun while committing the crimes, according to prosecutor Jim Cosper.

He was arrested after a 15-year-old girl claimed he lured her and a 17-year-old girl, a paraplegic confined to a wheelchair, to the apartment the night before.

The younger girl told police Henderson pulled out a handgun and forced her to have sex with him before he assaulted both girls and threatened to kill them.

Police said they found a .38 caliber handgun in Henderson's apartment, along with narcotics paraphernalia. He claimed that he gave them drugs in exchange for consensual sex. Henderson had no history of assaults or sexual misconduct prior to the 1983 incident. He pleaded no contest to the charges and entered a treatment center and remained there for seven months before his 28 months in prison. He states that "Hollywood" died on November 8, 1983, and he has remained clean and sober ever since.

Henderson made the news again in 2000 by winning the Lotto Texas US$28 million jackpot. He started a charity (East Side Youth Services & Street Outreach) and has made major donations to the East Austin community where he grew up. He currently gives motivational speeches and sells videos of his anti-drug seminars (HHH 56 Investments Ltd.). When asked by The Dallas Morning News what he does every day having won the lottery, Henderson responded, "Not a damn thing, and I don't start that until after lunch". He is the father of two daughters and has five grandchildren. Henderson says crack cocaine was his downfall, and that embarrassing his mother, family and friends ultimately changed him. He is now retired and lectures across the United States.

Books
Out of Control: Confessions of an NFL Casualty by Thomas Henderson and Peter Knobler (1987)
In Control: The Rebirth of an NFL Legend by Thomas Henderson and Frank Luksa (2004)

References

External links
Official Site (hollywoodhenderson.com)
Hollywood Act
It's Real Hollywood Ending for Transformed Henderson

1953 births
20th-century American criminals
African-American players of American football
American football linebackers
American people convicted of bribery
American people convicted of sexual assault
Dallas Cowboys players
Houston Oilers players
Langston Lions football players
Living people
Lottery winners
National Conference Pro Bowl players
Players of American football from Austin, Texas
Prisoners and detainees of California
San Francisco 49ers players
American sportspeople convicted of crimes
American male criminals
20th-century African-American sportspeople
21st-century African-American people